Barrio is a 1998 Spanish film directed by Fernando León de Aranoa. It won several awards including Best Director at the 13th Goya Awards, and was also nominated for Best Picture.

Plot 
Javi, Manu, and Rai are friends from school. They are teenagers, and they talk about girls a lot but seldom talk to them. They live in a poor neighborhood of Madrid with large social housing blocks. There is little to do, and in August even less. The centre of the city is far away, so the three friends spend most of their time in the neighborhood. On television, they see people that have flocked to the beaches for the summer, and they wish they were among them. Walking by travel offices they see tempting offers, but their lives demonstrate how hard it is to leave the neighborhood and to improve their situation. In the end, their lives take an unexpected turn.

Cast 
  as Rai
 Timy Benito as Javi
  as Manu
  as Susi, Javi's sister
  as Carmen, Javi's mother
 Enrique Villén as Ricardo, Javi's father
 Francisco Algora as Ángel, Manu's father
 Chete Lera as police inspector

Production 
The film was produced by Elías Querejeta. It was shot in Madrid, primarily in San Blas and La Elipa, but also in Aluche, Hortaleza, Carabanchel and Villaverde.

Release 
Distributed by Warner Sogefilms, the film was released on 2 October 1998. The film grossed 2.92 million € at the box office.

Awards and nominations 

|-
| align = "center" rowspan = "7" | 1999
| rowspan = "6" | 13th Goya Awards || colspan = "2" | Best Film ||  || rowspan = "6" | 
|-
| Best Director || Fernando León de Aranoa || 
|-
| Best Original Screenplay || Fernando León de Aranoa || 
|-
| Best Supporting Actor || Francisco Algora || 
|-
| Best Supporting Actress || Alicia Sánchez || 
|-
| Best New Actress || Marieta Orozco || 
|-
| 4th Forqué Awards || colspan = "2" | Best Film ||  || 
|}

References
Citations

Bibliography

External links

NY Times review for Barrio

Spanish drama films
1998 films
Films directed by Fernando León de Aranoa
Films shot in Spain
Films set in Madrid
1990s Spanish films